Peter "Pe" Schorowsky (born 15 June 1964) is a German musician and a founding member of the rock band Böhse Onkelz. He played drums until the band's split in 2005.

Biography
Schorowsky is the second of four brothers born to a Catholic family in the Baviarian town of Hösbach. After completing his formal education, he trained as a welder. He currently lives with his family in Oberägeri, Switzerland.

He met Stephan Weidner and Kevin Russell in his hometown of Hösbach. In November 1980, they formed Böhse Onkelz, with Schorowsky on drums. After the band left the Oi! music scene, they achieved considerable success from the 1990s until the band's breakup in 2005. 

In 2005, Schorowsky released his first book with the title Sophisticated: Aliens, Fliegenschiss & Mamas BH. .

External links
Official website (archived)
Band website of Böhse Onkelz

German rock musicians
German rock drummers
Male drummers
German male musicians
1964 births
Living people
People from Aschaffenburg (district)